In the 1970–71 season of Canadian ice hockey, the Manitoba Junior Hockey League (MJHL) champions were Winnipeg Saints (St. Boniface Saints), who won the Turnbull Memorial Trophy in the final on March 30, 1971, at home in St. Boniface. The Saints went on to win the Anavet Cup by defeating the Weyburn Red Wings of the Saskatchewan Junior Hockey League on April 13, 1971, at the St. James ground in Winnipeg.

Regular season

Playoffs 
Divisional Semi-Finals
Kenora defeated Dauphin 4-games-to-3
Portage lost to Selkirk 4-games-to-2
West Kildonan lost to St. Boniface 4-games-to-3
St. James defeated Winnipeg 4-games-to-2
Divisional Finals
Kenora defeated Selkirk 4-games-to-1
St. James lost to St. Boniface 4-games-to-none
Turnbull Cup Championship
Kenora lost to St. Boniface 4-games-to-none
Anavet Cup Championship
St. Boniface defeated Weyburn Red Wings (SJHL) 4-games-to-2
Abbott Cup Championship
St. Boniface lost to Red Deer Rustlers (AJHL) 4-games-to-none

Awards

All-Star Teams

External links 
 Manitoba Junior Hockey League
 Manitoba Hockey Hall of Fame
 Hockey Hall of Fame
 Winnipeg Free Press Archives
 Brandon Sun Archives

MJHL
Manitoba Junior Hockey League seasons